Haines is a surname.

Etymology

According to the Oxford Dictionary of Family Names in Britain and Ireland, the modern names Haine, Hayne, Haines, Hains, Hanes, and Haynes all originate in four different medieval names, which came to sound the same.

 The Middle English name Hain. This is thought to have originated as a pet form of Anglo-Norman names such as Reynald, Reyner and Rainbert.
 The personal name Hagan, which is itself of diverse origins.
 The Old English word haga ('enclosure', Middle English hay), in the oblique case form hagan (Middle English hayne), whose use could have arisen from a locative epithet such as æt hagan ('at the enclosure').
 Perhaps the Middle English word heyne (and its variants, such as haine, hayn), meaning 'mean wretch, niggard'.

The forms ending in -s show the addition of the genitive case ending, implying that the name-bearer was the child of a father called Hain, or addition of -s on the analogy of such names.

Additional etymologies for Haines and Haynes names not shared by the Hayne types are:
 the place-name of Haynes, Bedfordshire, indicating people from that village (whose name itself derived from Old English *hægen ('enclosures').
 the Irish name Hynes.

The Oxford Dictionary of Family Names in Britain and Ireland also considers the suggestion of origins in the Welsh name Einws (a pet form of Einion), but does not find evidence to support this.

Distribution
Around 2011, there were 9551 bearers of the surname Haines in Great Britain and 79 in Ireland. In 1881, there were 6890 bearers of the name in Great Britain, concentrated in the south of England, particularly in London, Gloucestershire, Berkshire, Wiltshire, and Warwickshire, while around the mid-nineteenth century bearers of the name in Ireland were concentrated in Cork.

Haines is the 410th most common surname in Great Britain with 23,109 bearers. It is most common in Gwynedd where it is the 6th most common surname with 4,931 bearers. Other concentrations include Merseyside, (198th, 1,727), Cheshire, (213th, 1,739), West Yorkshire, (245th, 1,751), Surrey, (281st, 1,815) and Essex (404th, 1,715).

Persons named Haines

Amy Haines (1839-1921), (also known as Amelia Horne and Amelia Bennett) British memoire writer
Andrew Haines (born 1947), British epidemiologist and academic
Andy Haines (born 1977), American baseball coach
Avery Haines (born 1966), Canadian television journalist
Avril Haines  (born 1969), First female Director of National Intelligence
Bob Haines (1906–1965), English cricketer
Carolyn Haines (born 1953), American author
Casey Haines (1986– ), American ice hockey player
Clinton Haines (1976–1997), Queensland, Australian computer hacker
Coral-Jade Haines (1996- ), English footballer
Daniel Haines (1801–1877), American jurist and governor of New Jersey
Daniel Haines (footballer) (born 1981), West Australian rules footballer
David Haines (aid worker) (1970–2014), British aid worker who was captured by ISIL and beheaded
Denis Haines, English musician with The Hollies and Gary Numan
Donald Haines (1918–1941), American child actor (Our Gang)
Elijah Haines, politician and author
Elwood Lindsay Haines (1893–1949), Episcopal bishop in the United States
Emily Haines (born 1974), Canadian vocalist for the bands Metric and Broken Social Scene
Eric Haines (born 1958), American computer graphics professional
Francina E. Haines, for whom Haines, Alaska was named.
Fred Haines (1936–2008), American screenwriter and film director 
Fred S. Haines  (1879–1960), Canadian painter from Meaford Ontario
Frederick Haines  (1819–1909), British Field Marshal and Commander-in-Chief of British forces in India 
Gail Haines, US politician, member of the Michigan House of Representatives
George Haines (1924–2006), US swimmer and swimming coach
Harry L. Haines (1880–1947), United States Congressman from Pennsylvania
Henry Haines (1836–1923), Railroad man, Confederate Colonel, Haines City Florida 
Hinkey Haines (1898–1979), American football and baseball player from Pennsylvania
Jackson Haines (1840–1875), American ballet dancer and figure skater
Janine Haines (1945–2004), South Australian politician
Jeffrey Robert Haines (born 1958), American Roman Catholic bishop
Jesse Haines (1893–1978), American baseball player
Jim Haines (born 1945), Victorian Australian rules footballer
Joe Haines (journalist) (born 1958), British journalist and press secretary to PM Harold Wilson
Joe Haines (politician) (1923–2015), US member of the Ohio House of Representatives
John Haines (disambiguation), several people, including:
John Haines (1924–2011), poet and educator 
John Charles Haines, (1818–1896), American businessman and politician, mayor of Chicago (1858–1860)
John Sydney Haines (1937–2009), Australian motor boat builder and racer
Joseph Haines (died  1701), English actor, singer, and dancer
Kathryn Miller Haines, American novelist and actor
Ken Haines, co-founder of Haines and Bronner UK
Larry Haines (1918–2008), American radio and soap opera actor
Lawrence Courtney Haines (c.1920–1996), Australian ornithologist, oologist and taxidermist
Linda M. Haines (born 1944), English and South African statistician
Lowell Haines, Americal lawyer and Taylor University president 
Luke Haines (born 1967), English musician
Mahlon Haines (1875–1962), US businessman and shoe salesman
Marie Bruner Haines (1885–1979), American painter and illustrator
Mark Haines, (1946–2011) TV host, CNBC network
Martha Haines (1923–2011), All-American Girls Professional Baseball League player
Nathan Haines (1972– ), New Zealand jazz musician
Nathan Haines (priest) (c.1735–1806), English priest
Paul Haines (fiction writer) (1970–2012), New Zealand-born horror and Sci-Fi writer
Paul Haines (poet) (1933–2003), US and Canadian poet and jazz lyricist
Ralph E. Haines, Jr. (1913–2011), United States Army four-star general
Reuben Haines III (1786-1831), American ornithologist and firefighter
Sara Haines (born 1977), American television host and journalist
Stephen G. Haines (born 1942), American organizational theorist, management consultant
Steve Haines, fictional character from Grand Theft Auto V.
Syd Haines, New Zealand (soccer) footballer
Walter Stanley Haines (1850–1923), American forensic scientist
William Haines (disambiguation), several people including:
William Haines (1900–1973), American actor in silent movies
William Haines (Australian politician) (1810–1866), first Premier of Victoria
William Haines (South Australian politician) (1831–1902), a South Australian politician
William Wister Haines (1908–1989), American author, screenwriter, and playwright
Willie Haines (1900–1974), Portsmouth and Southampton footballer

References

English-language surnames
Surnames of English origin
Surnames of Old English origin